Sweden participated at the 2017 Summer Universiade which was held in Taipei, Taiwan.

Sweden sent a delegation consisting of  68 competitors for the event competing in 12 sporting events. Sweden claimed two medals at the multi-sport event.

Participants

Medallists

References 

2017 in Swedish sport
Nations at the 2017 Summer Universiade